Maria Polyzou (born 10 November 1968) is a Greek long-distance runner. She competed in the women's marathon at the 1996 Summer Olympics.

References

1968 births
Living people
Athletes (track and field) at the 1996 Summer Olympics
Greek female long-distance runners
Greek female marathon runners
Olympic athletes of Greece
Athletes from Patras